TQL Stadium, called West End Stadium during construction, is a soccer-specific stadium in Cincinnati, Ohio. It is the home of FC Cincinnati, a Major League Soccer (MLS) team that had been temporarily playing at Nippert Stadium. The stadium is located in the West End neighborhood, at the former site of Stargel Stadium on Central Parkway at Wade Street. The stadium cost about $250 million to construct and holds 26,000 spectators.

The stadium was proposed in 2016, as part of the team's bid for an MLS expansion franchise, and a list of sites was submitted with the bid in January 2017. A shortlist of three sites, in Oakley, the West End, and Newport, Kentucky, was announced in May 2017. The West End site was chosen in early 2018 and approved in April through a land swap deal with Cincinnati Public Schools. On May 29, 2018, MLS announced that Cincinnati had won an expansion team, to begin play in 2019 at Nippert Stadium. A groundbreaking ceremony was held on December 18, 2018, and the stadium officially opened on May 16, 2021.

Planning

Background

FC Cincinnati was founded in 2015 and played its first three seasons in the second-division United Soccer League (since renamed the USL Championship) at Nippert Stadium, a college football venue. After a successful first season in which the team's home games averaged 17,296 attendees, the club's ownership group began negotiations with Major League Soccer to bid for an expansion franchise. Cincinnati formally submitted its expansion bid in January 2017, including a shortlist of locations for a potential stadium to meet the bid's requirement for a soccer-specific venue.

FC Cincinnati's management first suggested the possibility of building a new stadium in late November 2016, when the club hosted MLS commissioner Don Garber for a day-long visit. During a town hall meeting held with club supporters that day, Garber suggested that Nippert was not a long-term solution for the team. Club president Jeff Berding said during the meeting that the club had recently begun to look for  sites in or near the "urban core" of Cincinnati.

Location decision and negotiations

FC Cincinnati narrowed the list of locations for a potential stadium to a shortlist of three sites in May 2017: the football stadium used by Taft High School in the West End neighborhood; the former Milacron factory in Oakley on Interstate 71; and a riverfront site in Newport, Kentucky. The club unveiled preliminary designs for a stadium in June 2017, outlining plans for a horseshoe-shaped stadium with a continuous roof and capacity for 25,000 to 30,000 people. It was designed by Dan Meis, who envisioned steep terraced seating and homages to Allianz Arena in Munich, including the use of LED lights and a translucent ETFE roof, for use at the three shortlist sites.

In November 2017, the Cincinnati City Council passed legislation that would fund infrastructure improvements and a parking garage at the stadium, should a location within the city be chosen. The Oakley site was named as the leading candidate and formed the basis of the city council's infrastructure legislation. FC Cincinnati presented its bid to MLS in December, including a stadium at the Oakley site, but the Nashville bid was chosen instead for a 2020 expansion.

The club signed an option contract with the Cincinnati Metropolitan Housing Authority to acquire land in the West End neighborhood in January 2018, signalling their intent to choose the site. The following month, FC Cincinnati revealed plans to perform a land swap with Cincinnati Public Schools to acquire Stargel Stadium on the campus of Taft High School, with a new high school stadium being built nearby. The land swap would require the approval of the Cincinnati Public School's board of directors, who declined to accept the club's offer because of tax abatement rules, which would require an additional $20 million in taxes to be paid by FC Cincinnati. In response, FC Cincinnati announced in March that it would remove the West End site from consideration and focus on the remaining two sites, which had the support of their respective county governments. By early April, however, the club had announced that the Oakley and Newport sites were out of contention, due to the remoteness of the Oakley site and a landowner dispute in Newport, and that FC Cincinnati would restart negotiations for the West End site.

The school board received an offer from the club to pay $25 million and build a new $10 million high school stadium and unanimously approved the land swap on April 10. The club signed a community benefits agreement with the West End Neighborhood Council, despite opposition from a majority of the council, but the proposal was amended and agreed to by a majority of the council weeks later. On April 16, the city council voted 5–4 for an ordinance that would fund $40 million in infrastructure improvements to support the stadium project. A second city council vote on May 16 approved the community benefits agreement and was the final city action needed before a decision by MLS. The league awarded the expansion franchise in an announcement on May 29.

The construction of a new $200 million stadium with public money remained controversial, culminating in the formation of a citizens' group in 2017 to push Nippert Stadium as the permanent home of Cincinnati's MLS team. FC Cincinnati ruled out the use of Nippert Stadium due to the stadium's outdated design that would present construction challenges. During the final negotiations for the West End site, a separate group proposed that the community benefits agreement be decided in a public referendum, but were rejected on the grounds that the city council used an emergency ordinance to approve the stadium deal.

Design revisions and criticism

Under a preliminary design schematic released in May 2018, the stadium would have 21,080 seats, with 16,610 general admission seats and 3,970 premium seats. An additional 7,000 seats would be added by filling in two of the corners and ends. However, in June 2018, the club said that they were essentially "starting over" on designing the stadium. Club president Jeff Berding said that he expected the capacity to be somewhere between 21,000 and 30,000 spectators, depending on what the club could afford.

In October 2018, FC Cincinnati released new design concept images of the West End Stadium for the first time since the stadium site had been finalized. As in previous designs, the roof and exterior facades would be made of ETFE foil, a translucent material upon which colors and designs may be projected. The stadium was now expected to hold between 25,500 and 26,500 attendees, which would make it one of the largest soccer-specific stadiums in North America.

In response to criticism from West End residents, the stadium design was revised again in February 2019. The roof's orange color was replaced, and the 428-stall parking garage was relocated to the intersection of Central Parkway and Wade Street. The stadium's design was also constrained by a Duke Energy transmission line that is buried underneath the site. The city government subsequently approved an additional land sale for the stadium during the same month, for a police parking lot that would grant the city $8 million in revenue. The club also contracted a consulting firm to determine the stadium's impact to the nearby Cincinnati Music Hall, including tests with blank cartridges from a shotgun, and concluded that the stadium noise would interfere with musical performances.

MEIS Architects was removed as the head architecture firm from the project by FC Cincinnati and replaced by Populous, a Kansas City-based company responsible for several MLS venues. The new design revision, announced in March 2019, restored a reduced version of the orange lighting on the roof and exterior and expanded the canopy to cover the entire seating area. A grand staircase would connect the stadium's concourse with Central Parkway, while the exterior walls were redesigned to resemble a series of "ribbons" that wrap around the outer bowl. The club also acquired several additional properties in April 2019 along Wade Street to build a larger parking structure. A zoning change to support commercial development on the Wade Street site drew criticism due to the potential displacement of at least 17 residents of the existing apartment buildings on the property.

In July 2019, Populous and FC Cincinnati unveiled a new design for the West End Stadium that replaced the exterior lighting and ETFE facade with vertical "fins" that individually light up to create special effects and animations. The club's proposal to extend the lighting scheme to include advertisements and other promotions was opposed by the Over-the-Rhine Community Council, who also criticized the permitting of year-round lighting. The final seating capacity will be 26,000 spectators, including 59 suites and a premium club area with 4,500 seats. The stadium will include 3,100 seats in a safe standing terrace that will replace The Bailey. The patterns and colors of the seating area, featuring navy blue seats and "Gary" the winged lion from the club crest in orange, were chosen from four options by a public poll in May 2020.

Funding

The stadium cost $250 million to construct, with the majority of funding coming from FC Cincinnati and its ownership group. The club also funded $6.2 million in West End improvements and $10 million for a new high school football stadium, in addition to $25 million to Cincinnati Public Schools as part of the land use agreement. Infrastructure improvements around the stadium will be paid for using $34 million in city funds from a local tax increment financing district and $19 million from Hamilton County and the State of Ohio. In June 2018, the club named U.S. Bank as the financial partner for the project.

Naming rights

On June 22, 2020, FC Cincinnati filed suit against Premier Partnerships, a company they had contracted to broker a naming rights deal, alleging negligence amid a push to make a deal with a prospective sponsor on terms that were against MLS rules or financially infeasible for the team. The lawsuit did not mention the prospective sponsor by name, but The Cincinnati Enquirer reported that documents attached to the suit mentioned Mercy Health, the team's jersey sponsor.

On April 21, 2021, Total Quality Logistics (TQL) was named as the naming rights sponsor of the stadium by FC Cincinnati, having come to a long-term agreement with the club.

Construction

TQL Stadium was designed by Populous, MEIS Architects, and Elevar Design Group. Turner Construction was hired as the general contractor, working alongside Jostin Construction, and will require 200 to 400 workers during the duration of construction. Machete Group is providing oversight on the project as the owner's representative. The project began major construction in 2019, after the new Stargel Stadium was completed at a nearby location.

The original Stargel Stadium closed permanently on October 26, 2018, and demolition began the following month while the property was transferred from Cincinnati Public Schools to the club for $10 million. The new Stargel Stadium was built southwest of Taft High School and opened in September 2019 for the fall sports season after a month-long construction delay. A ceremonial groundbreaking for the TQL Stadium took place on December 18, 2018, attended by league commissioner Don Garber and local elected officials. Construction was scheduled to begin after demolition of the original Stargel Stadium was completed in January 2019. Foundation pouring was expected to begin in March, followed by structural erection in May. However, these dates were later pushed back to July and November respectively, according to the stadium's website.

The first roof trusses were installed in May 2020, with work continuing during the COVID-19 pandemic. Work was halted in early August due to two "racist incidents" involving subcontractors at the stadium site, resulting in mandatory anti-bias training for workers. The exterior's structural elements, including the roof and canopy, was topped out in July 2020 with the installation of the final steel beam. The stadium's hybrid turf pitch and its grow lights were installed in January 2021, using grass harvested from a supplier in Brookville, Indiana. The exterior, signage, and interiors were finished in early 2021. TQL Stadium opened with a ribbon-cutting ceremony on May 1, 2021, and hosted its first regular season match on May 16, between FC Cincinnati and Inter Miami CF.

TQL Stadium was named Best Venue of 2022 by The World Football Summit on September 28, 2022, at an awards event in Madrid, Spain.

Transportation

The stadium is located along Central Parkway, which splits the West End and Over-the-Rhine neighborhoods just northwest of Downtown Cincinnati, between John and Wade streets. The area is currently served by SORTA buses and is two blocks from a streetcar stop on the Cincinnati Bell Connector. The club has proposed closing a two-block section of Central Parkway to traffic to create a pedestrian promenade on gamedays, subject to city approval. On-site parking is expected to be provided by a county-built garage with 1,000 spaces.

Events

Soccer

International men's matches

International women's matches

Concerts
TQL Stadium hosted English rock band The Who on May 15, 2022, as a part of the band's "The Who Hits Back" Tour. It was the band's first concert in the city since the disaster at one of their shows in 1979. The event was the first concert held at the stadium.

References

External links

 
 Design images by Populous
 Design images by MEIS Architects

 
Sports venues in Cincinnati
Major League Soccer stadiums
Soccer venues in Ohio
Sports venues completed in 2021
West End, Cincinnati
2021 establishments in Ohio